Anna "Nanette" Bondra (21 March 1798 – 11 July 1836) was an Austrian operatic soprano and mezzo-soprano.

Life 
Born in Vienna (Habsburg monarchy), Anna (auch Nanette) Bondra, the daughter of a Viennese choir director, was the younger sister of the singer Therese Bondra (1794-1816). From January 22, 1811 to June 30, 1822 she was a member of the k.k. Hoftheater and subsequently belonged to the ensemble of the Italian Opera in Vienna.

Her embodiment of Marcelline at the premiere of the third, final version of Beethoven's Fidelio, which took place on 23 May 1814 at the Theater am Kärntnertor, is of significance to music history. In order to distinguish her from her older sister, she was mentioned on the notice as "Dlle. Bondra d.j.".

Later she also sang mezzo-soprano roles and was successful as a concert soloist.

"Anna Bondra, opera singer at the K.K. Hoftheater nächst dem Kärntnerthore" last lived in the Kärntner Straße No. 1076 and died at the age of only 38 years after a Scarlet fever "from deposition of the scarlet rash on the brain".

Further reading 
 Neuer Nekrolog der Deutschen, volume 14, 1st part, Weimar 1838,  (online)
 Constantin von Wurzbach: Bondra, Anna. In Biographisches Lexikon des Kaiserthums Oesterreich. 2nd part. Publisher of the typographic-literary-artistic institution (L. C. Zamarski, C. Dittmarsch & Comp.), Vienna 1857,  Bondra, Anna.
 Katalog der Portrait-Sammlung der k. u. k. General-Intendanz der k. k. Hoftheater. Zugleich ein biographisches Hilfsbuch auf dem Gebiet von Theater und Musik. Group IV. Wiener Hoftheater, Vienna 1892, 
 Willy Hess: Das Fidelio-Buch. Winterthur 1986
 Kutsch/Riemens: Großes Sängerlexikon. Unveränderte Auflage, K. G. Saur, Bern, 1993, first volume A–L,  (3 volumes)

References

External links 
 Anna Bondra in the Carl-Maria-von-Weber-Gesamtausgabe

Austrian operatic sopranos
Austrian operatic mezzo-sopranos
1798 births
1836 deaths
Musicians from Vienna
19th-century women composers